Mees de Wit (born 17 April 1998) is a Dutch professional footballer who plays  as a left-back for AZ Alkmaar.

Career
De Wit made his Eerste Divisie debut for Jong Ajax on 25 August 2017 in a game against Fortuna Sittard. He signed for Sporting's U-23 team for the 2018–19 season on 19 July 2018. On 11 March 2019, Stefano van Delden, De Wit's agent in 2017 and 2018, made the news as he was suspected of threatening different members of the AFC Ajax board on several occasions during the period from 26 October 2017 to 25 September 2018.

On 20 January 2020, de Wit moved to Spanish club Orihuela CF on loan for the rest of the season.

On 6 July 2021, he returned to the Netherlands and signed a contract with PEC Zwolle for two years.

De Wit performed exceptionally while playing for PEC Zwolle, leading to a five-year contract with AZ Alkmaar starting in July 2022.

External links

References

Living people
1998 births
Dutch footballers
Footballers from Amsterdam
Association football forwards
Netherlands youth international footballers
Eredivisie players
Eerste Divisie players
Segunda División B players
AFC Ajax players
Jong Ajax players
Sporting CP B players
Orihuela CF players
PEC Zwolle players
AZ Alkmaar players
Dutch expatriate footballers
Dutch expatriate sportspeople in Portugal
Expatriate footballers in Portugal
Dutch expatriate sportspeople in Spain
Expatriate footballers in Spain